War Drums is a 1957 American Western film directed by Reginald Le Borg, written by Gerald Drayson Adams, and starring Lex Barker, Joan Taylor, Ben Johnson, Larry Chance, Richard H. Cutting and John Pickard.  The film was produced by Aubrey Schenck and Howard W. Koch for United Artists and it was released on March 21, 1957.

Plot
Prior to the American Civil War, a group of Apache led by their chief Mangas Coloradas track some of their stolen horses to a group of Mexicans. The Apaches kill the lot of them and take their communal woman Riva. The Apaches' initial intention was to sell Riva north of the border to the Americans. On two occasions, Mangas refuses to sell Riva to his good friend Luke Fargo (Ben Johnson), despite being offered excellent deals for her.

Luke brings a government representative to meet with Mangas, trying to come to terms with the Apaches. The most Mangas will promise is the Apache will not break the peace with the whites first.

Mangas desires Riva for his wife, an honor never before extended to a Mexican woman. He has to fight three braves who disagree with him, killing all three. He then tells the band that Riva will not be a squaw, but will be trained as a warrior, again breaking with custom. Following Mangas's second refusal to sell him Riva, whom Luke also wants for a wife, Luke reluctantly attends their wedding.

Meanwhile a group of American gold seekers enter the Apache lands. After making a gold strike in a stream, they attack the Indians camped on the bank. When Mangas comes to bring the offending miners to the law, they pinion and whip him. This sets off an Apache war, with Mangas Coloradas becoming known as "Red Sleeves."

Luke attempts to put a stop to the war by bringing a representative from Washington to meet with Mangas. The attempt fails when the men with him, thinking they are about to be ambushed by the Apaches, fire on them. In the ensuing firefight, Luke is shot by an arrow. Taken to Mangas's camp, Riva removes the arrow and nurses Luke back to health. He is sent back with a message from Mangas to the government.

When the Civil War breaks out, Luke volunteers for the Union and is commissioned a major in the cavalry. He is assigned to the frontier, to deal with the Apache problem. Meanwhile, Mangas is wounded on a raid, taking a bullet that shatters his breastbone. Riva takes him to a town with a doctor. Mangas promises the doctor that if he can patch him up and he lives, the town will be safe from the Apaches. But if he dies, the tribe will kill everyone in the town and burn it to the ground.

While he is being worked on by the doctor, Luke and a troop of cavalry arrive. He goes forward to the defenses set up by the Apache under a flag of truce, and recognized by braves who know him and his friendship with Mangas, is passed inside. The friends meet and talk, and Luke leads Mangas, Riva, and their warriors out of the town. Luke advises Mangas to take his people deep into the mountains where it will be a long time (if ever) before the cavalry can come after them. Wishing each other well, Mangas and Riva take their leave of Luke and lead their people away from the town.

Cast 
	
Lex Barker as Mangas Coloradas
Joan Taylor as Riva
Ben Johnson as Luke Fargo
Larry Chance as Ponce
Richard H. Cutting as Judge Benton 
John Pickard as Sheriff Bullard
James Parnell as Arizona
John Colicos as Chino
Tom Monroe as Dutch Herman
Jil Jarmyn as Nona
Jeanne Carmen as Yellow Moon
Mauritz Hugo as Clay Staub
Ward Ellis as Delgadito
Jack Hupp as Lt. Roberts

Production
Parts of the film were shot in Kanab Canyon and Johnson Canyon in Utah.

According to the July 1956 Hollywood Reporter, there were accidents on the set of War Drums. A lightning strike destroyed a generator, delaying production a few days, and a fire burned up one of the wardrobe trailers.

References

External links 
 
 

1957 films
United Artists films
American Western (genre) films
1957 Western (genre) films
Films directed by Reginald Le Borg
Films scored by Les Baxter
Films shot in Utah
1950s English-language films
1950s American films